Carlos Alberto Visentín (28 November 1918 – 12 October 2017) was an Argentine water polo player who competed in the 1948 Summer Olympics and in the 1952 Summer Olympics. Visentín died in October 2017 at the age of 98.

References

1918 births
2017 deaths
Argentine male water polo players
Olympic water polo players of Argentina
Water polo players at the 1948 Summer Olympics
Water polo players at the 1952 Summer Olympics